Pablo Ricardo de Souza (born 7 March 1991) is a Brazilian footballer who plays for Clube Esportivo Aimoré as a defender.

Club career
Born in São Gonçalo, Rio de Janeiro, Pablo represented Atlético Paranaense and Boavista Sport Club as a youth. He started his senior professional career in 2012 with Associação Atlética Anapolina, representing São José dos Campos Futebol Clube, Associação Esportiva Jataiense, Duque de Caxias Futebol Clube in the following years.

On 14 September 2015, Pablo signed with second tier club Mogi Mirim Esporte Clube. On 31 October, he made his debut, playing the whole ninety minutes of a 2–0 defeat against Ceará Sporting Club. He contributed with 4 games in the league.

In February 2017, Pablo signed with Esporte Clube Novo Hamburgo after a stint with São Carlos Futebol Clube. He played 16 matches as his club won the 2017 Campeonato Gaúcho. On 11 May 2017, he signed with Luverdense of the second tier. He scored his first goal on 6 June, in a 1–1 draw against Vila Nova Futebol Clube.

References

External links

1991 births
Living people
Association football defenders
Brazilian footballers
Associação Atlética Anapolina players
Duque de Caxias Futebol Clube players
Mogi Mirim Esporte Clube players
Esporte Clube Novo Hamburgo players
São Carlos Futebol Clube players
Luverdense Esporte Clube players
Clube Atlético Joseense players
Esporte Clube São Luiz players
Clube Esportivo Aimoré players
Campeonato Brasileiro Série B players
Campeonato Brasileiro Série C players
People from São Gonçalo, Rio de Janeiro
Sportspeople from Rio de Janeiro (state)